Baharlı or  Bakharly or Bagarly may refer to:

Places

Azerbaijan
Baharlı, Agdam (disambiguation)
Baharlı, Üçoğlan
Baharlı, Xındırıstan
Birinci Baharlı
İkinci Baharlı
Baharlı, Zangilan

Turkey
 Baharlı, Bismil
 Baharlı, Tarsus, a village in the district of Tarsus, Mersin Province

Turkmenistan
 Baharly District

Seo also 
Baharlu (disambiguation)